Aniston Fernandes (born 4 July 1993) is an Indian professional footballer who plays as a midfielder for Dempo in the I-League.

Career

Early career
Born in Betalbatim, Goa, Fernandes started playing football for his school team at the age of eight while attending St Anthony’s High School. He then joined his village school, St Judas High School, before joining the Tata Football Academy in 2008. He then joined the youth team at Dempo in 2011. While at Dempo, Fernandes played for the youth side in the GFA 2nd Division as well as the first-team in the Goa Professional League, the top state league in Goa. Also, in 2011, along with teammate Myron Fernandes, Aniston went abroad to Denmark for three to four months to train at the academy of Danish Superliga side FC Midtjylland.

Dempo
On 8 March 2014 Fernandes made his professional debut for Dempo in the I-League against Sporting Goa at the Fatorda Stadium. He came on as a 90th-minute substitute for Alwyn George as Dempo won the match 4–0.

International

Goa-India
On 7 January 2014 it was announced that Fernandes was selected in the 20-man squad for the Goa-India football team that would participate in the 2014 Lusophony Games being played in Goa.

Career statistics

Honours

Goa Lusophony 
 Lusophony Games Gold medal: 2014

References

External links 
 I-League Profile.

1993 births
Living people
Indian footballers
Dempo SC players
Indian Christians
Association football midfielders
Footballers from Goa
I-League players